Vertir Airlines was an airline based in Yerevan, Armenia, that provided cargo services out of Zvartnots International Airport. The company was founded in 2007, and revenue flights were launched on 29 August 2010. The company ceased operations in 2016.

Fleet
The Vertir Airlines fleet consisted of the following aircraft (as of August 2016):
 1 Airbus A300-600R

Over the years, the following aircraft types were operated:

References

Defunct airlines of Armenia
Airlines established in 2009
Armenian companies established in 2009